Parunak Ferukhan (1884 – 1915) was a famed violinist, officer in the Finance Ministry and Official of the Bakırköy (Makriköy) administration. He was a victim of the Armenian genocide.

Life
Of Armenian descent, Parunak Ferukhan was born in Istanbul, Ottoman Empire. During the Armenian genocide, he belonged to the second convoy with only two survivors that left Çankırı on 19 August 1915. He was jailed in Ankara on 20–24 August and killed en route to Yozgat.

References

1884 births
1915 deaths
Musicians from Istanbul
People who died in the Armenian genocide
Violinists from the Ottoman Empire
Armenian violinists
Armenian politicians
Armenians from the Ottoman Empire
20th-century violinists